The Power is a 1956 science fiction novel by American writer Frank M. Robinson. It first appeared in the March 1956 edition of Blue Book magazine and then in a standalone book published by J. B. Lippincott in May that year. Its protagonist, a researcher named Tanner, discovers evidence of a person with psychic abilities among his coworkers. As he tries to uncover the superhuman, his existence is erased and his associates murdered, until he faces a showdown with an apparently invincible opponent.

The novel was made into a Studio One television episode and a 1968 film under the same name.

Reception
Galaxy reviewer Floyd C. Gale praised the novel as "a harrowing chase that will have you biting your nails." Anthony Boucher found that the novel's logical extrapolation was "not so much absurd as just absent. . . . . there has never been a less credible picture of the next step in evolution"; but he, too, praised Robinson's melodramatic storytelling.

References

1956 American novels
1956 science fiction novels
American science fiction novels
Novels by Frank M. Robinson
American novels adapted into films